The , originally the New Japan Design Competition, is an annual award given to outstanding Japanese designers. The award, founded in 1952, is sponsored by Japanese newspaper Mainichi Shimbun. It is considered Japan's most prestigious award for design.

References

External links 
 Mainichi Design Prize Homepage 

Design awards